Letters from Baghdad is a 2016 documentary film about the life and work of Gertrude Bell. It was executive produced by Tilda Swinton, who also provides voiceover work as Bell.

Cast

Voice-overs
 Tilda Swinton as Gertrude Bell (older)
 Rose Leslie as Gertrude Bell (younger)
 Paul McGann as Henry Cadogan (son of Frederick William Cadogan)
 Pip Torrens as 'Dick' Doughty-Wylie
 Robert Ian Mackenzie as Winston Churchill
 Richard Poe as Standard Oil Man
 Nicholas Hunt as British ambassador to Turkey Louis du Pan Mallet
 Peter Day as Lord Cromer

Talking heads
 Eric Loscheider as T. E. Lawrence (Lawrence of Arabia)
 Helen Ryan as Lady Florence Bell
 Rachael Stirling as Vita Sackville-West
 Christopher Villiers as Sir Leonard Woolley
 Lucy Robinson as Lady Molly Trevelyan
 Elizabeth Rider as Lady Elsa Richmond
 Michael Higgs as Brigadier Sir Gilbert Clayton
 Joanna David as Janet E. Courtney
 Jürgen Kalwa as German ambassador Friedrich Rosen
 Tom Chadbon as Valentine Chirol
 Simon Chandler as David George Hogarth
 Andrew Havill as British High Commissioner in Baghdad Percy Cox
 Anthony Edridge as Arnold Wilson
 Michelle Eugene as Dorothy Van Ess (wife of John van Ess)
 Mark Meadows as military governor of Baghdad Frank Balfour

Reception
Letters from Baghdad received mostly positive reviews from critics. On Metacritic the film has a score of 71% based on reviews from 12 critics.

Jay Weissberg of Variety both complimented the effort and questioned the historical omissions that might taint the portrait of their subject: "Getting Swinton on board doing double duty as voiceover actor and executive producer was a wise marketing decision, while the involvement of Thelma Schoonmaker and Kevin Brownlow assured appropriate attention would be given to the artistic and archival sides. The film also features staged talking heads speaking words sourced from letters and journals. Absent however is any hint of Edward Said’s accusation of Orientalism that’s intermittently colored modern assessments of Bell’s crucial role in the foundation of modern Iraq; also missing are any negative assessments by her Arab contemporaries. Viewers attuned to chronology may object to the way footage from different eras is mixed together — the visuals accompanying a 1918 letter are certainly not from 1918 — yet that kind of criticism could be considered pedantic. The bottom line is that Oelbaum and Krayenbühl have fleshed out a complex, fascinating figure, and after a successful festival career, it’s good to see 'Letters' getting its due via limited release."

References

External links
 
 Official website

2016 films